Tim Cummings (born 1973) is an American actor and author.

Early life 
Timothy P Cummings was born in Port Jefferson, New York to James A. and Rosemarie Cummings. He has four siblings and one half-sibling. His father was a Lieutenant with the NYFD (Engine 82, Ladder 31) in the South Bronx for thirty years.

Education 
Cummings graduated from Comsewogue High School, where he appeared in Brighton Beach Memoirs, Twelve Angry Men, Babes in Arms, You're A Good Man Charlie Brown and Bye Bye Birdie. He then attended New York University's Tisch School of the Arts, where he received a BFA. While at NYU, he studied at The Stella Adler Conservatory and The Experimental Theater Wing. He performed in productions of The White Album Project, Fornes's The Conduct of Life, Brecht's Threepenny Opera, Shakespeare's Titus Andronicus, Shaw's Man & Superman, Durang's Naomi In The Living Room and Maeterlink's The Intruder.

Cummings received his MFA in Creative Writing (Writing for Young People) from Antioch University Los Angeles, in June, 2018.

Acting career 
After graduating from NYU, Cummings began performing as a company member in two of New York City's downtown theater & dance companies, Big Dance Theater and The Builders Association, with whom he toured extensively, performing in festivals across US, the UK, and Europe.

He later performed with The Flea Theater, in Mac Wellman's Sincerity Forever, Cleveland, and Three Americanisms, as well as the melodrama Billy the Kid written by Walter Woods in 1903.

He directed an original black comedy by Kenny Finkle, Transatlantica. He was an understudy in the Off-Broadway play The Guys and in the Broadway revival of Frankie and Johnny in the Clair de Lune'.

Cummings subsequently relocated to Los Angeles to work in television and film in addition to theatre, where he played Ned Weeks in Larry Kramer's The Normal Heart as well as Patsy in The New Electric Ballroom by Enda Walsh.

Cummings served as Associate Director of the Youth Program at The Ojai Playwrights Conference from 2011 to 2017.

Career in writing

 In 2023, Cummings' debut novel, Alice the Cat, will be published by Fitzroy Books, the Young Adult & Middle-grade imprint of Regal House Publishing
 In 2019, Cummings' essay, You Have Changed Me Forever, won lauded literary magazine Critical Read's Origins essay contest. 
 In 2018, he had numerous works (interviews, reviews, short stories, essays, poetry,) accepted for publications at several prominent literary journals and magazines: Lunch Ticket, Larb, From Whispers to Roars, Meow Meow Pow Pow, F(r)iction, and Critical Read.
 In 2017 he released an eclectic collection of stories, poetry, and dramatic writings, called Anthology: The Ojai Playwrights Conference Youth Workshop 2006-2016. It was written by several participants of The Ojai Playwrights Conference Youth Workshop.  He compiled and edited the collection in conjunction with his Master of Fine Arts program at Antioch University Los Angeles.
 The summer of 2011 saw the release of a unique collection called Orphans, which incorporates short stories, poetry, screenplays, plays, a film treatment.
 He wrote the full-length play, Bully, which explores the epidemic of teens committing suicide for being bullied.
 He is a regular contributor at Los Angeles Review of Books where he writes reviews, interviews, and profiles.

Awards and nominations

 Work 
 Film 
 Can You Ever Forgive Me?
 Kensho at the Bedfellow
 Spirited
 Something Strange
 Presence
 Sunken Warrior
 Exit Interview
 The Box
 Making 'Three Americanisms'
 The Guys
 Morning Fall
 The Gas Heart

 Television 
 Criminal Minds
 GRIMM
 My Two Fans
 Rosewood

 Stage 
2010–2019

 Daniel's Husband
 Cal In Camo
 The House in Scarsdale: A Memoir for the Stage
 Need To Know
 2015 Ojai Playwrights Conference
 The Woodsman
 2014 Ojai Playwrights Conference
 Nine Hours (Young Playwrights Festival at Blank Theatre Company)
 Reunion
 Skylight Theatre's SALUTE to Terrence McNally
 The Normal Heart
 2013 Ojai Playwrights Conference
 2013 Pacific Playwrights Festival
 The Phantom Tollbooth
 The Firebird (with the LA Phil)
 Eurydice (Ruhl play)
 2012 Ojai Playwrights Conference
 The Grapes of Wrath
 The New Electric Ballroom
 Winterfest—47 Plays in 18 Days (Producer/Performer/Playwright)
 The Guys (10-year Anniversary performances)
 2011 Ojai Playwrights Conference
 The Walworth Farce''
 Camino Real
 War
 The Winter's Tale
 Magic Framework
 The Soltanoff/Findlay Wkshp

2000–2009

 Slasher
 Hamlet
 Tartuffe
 The Diary of a Teenage Girl
 The Last Schwartz
 The Pursuit of Happiness
 The Guys (5-year Anniversary performances)
 The Outsiders Presents IV
 The Handlers
 Madelyn Kent's Peninsula
 Constantly Distracted (Director)
 "IV"
 Lanford Wilson's Burn This
 The Moonlight Sonata
 Patrick Marber's Closer (play)
 Host
 The Seagull
 Madelyn Kent's SHUFU: Iraqi Interview
 Mac Wellman's Three Americanisms
 The Homecoming
 Frankie and Johnny in the Clair de Lune
 Transatlantica
 The Guys
 Billy the Kid
 No Mother to Guide Her
 Mac Wellman's Cleveland
 Mac Wellman's Sincerity Forever
 Centaur Battle of San Jacinto

1990–1999

 Jet Lag (1998-2000)
 Park
 Girl Gone
 A Simple Heart
 The Gas Heart
 Sugar Down Billie Hoak
 The Fairground Booth
 20/21
 Distortion Taco
 Anus Mundi
 Mississippi Nude
 Leopold and Loeb are Dead Now
 The White Album Project
 The Conduct of Life
 The Threepenny Opera
 Terrence McNally's Andre's Mother
 Naomi in the Living Room
 Man and Superman
 Titus Andronicus
 Geography of a Horse Dreamer
 Brecht's Fear and Misery of the Third Reich
 Intruder (play)
 West Side Story
 Brighton Beach Memoirs

1985–1989

 Bye Bye Birdie
 The Fantasticks
 Guys & Dolls
 Sweet Charity
 Twelve Angry Men
 Cinderella
 Grease
 Fiddler on the Roof
 Babes in Arms
 Free to Be You and Me
 The Sound of Music
 Snoopy! The Musical
 Bye Bye Birdie
 Alice in Wonderland
 You're a Good Man Charlie Brown
 Frankly, Franklin

References

External links 
 Tim Cummings at Broadway World
 
 Tim Cummings at The Authors Guild

1973 births
Living people
Writers from New York (state)
Male actors from New York (state)
American male film actors
American male stage actors
American male television actors
People from Port Jefferson, New York
Tisch School of the Arts alumni
Date of birth missing (living people)